Evan Gumbs (born 21 July 1997) is an English professional footballer who plays as a defender for Warrington Town.

Career
Gumbs joined Tranmere Rovers's youth setup in 2010, after failed trials at Everton and Liverpool. On 15 November 2014 he made his professional debut, playing the last 18 minutes in a 0–1 away loss against Luton Town in a League Two fixture.

On 19 June 2015, Gumbs along with three other youth system products signed his first professional one-year contract.

On 13 August 2015 Gumbs joined Northern Premier League side Burscough on a one-month youth loan. Following his return to Tranmere he twice has been an unused substitute before joining on loan another Northern Premier League side Trafford on 12 October. Initial one-month loan was extended for another month.

On 7 August 2020 Gumbs joined Northern Premier League side Warrington Town on a permanent basis, after his release from parent club Tranmere Rovers.

In February 2021, Gumbs joined Cymru Premier club Flint Town United. In October 2021, he was sent out on loan to Northern Premier League Division One West side Runcorn Linnets on loan in order to gain some match fitness following a knee injury. He went on to make nine appearances in all competitions.

Statistics

References

External links

1997 births
Living people
Sportspeople from Runcorn
English footballers
Association football defenders
Tranmere Rovers F.C. players
Salford City F.C. players
Trafford F.C. players
Burscough F.C. players
Bradford (Park Avenue) A.F.C. players
Warrington Town F.C. players
Runcorn Linnets F.C. players
English Football League players
Northern Premier League players
National League (English football) players
Cymru Premier players
Flint Town United F.C. players